Aspen Lake is a swampy lake in the Southern Cascade Range, just west of Klamath Falls, Oregon, United States.

Trout is the primary species for fishing in Aspen Lake. According to the Oregon Department of Fish and Wildlife it also offers fishing for brown bullhead.

Aspen Lake is also a good spot for bird-watching, reportedly one of the areas where the rare yellow rail has nested.

In popular culture
In the GameCube games Wave Race: Blue Storm and 1080° Avalanche, Aspen Lake is a playable level.

See also
Aspen Butte
List of lakes in Oregon

References

Klamath Falls, Oregon
Aspen
Lakes of Klamath County, Oregon